Beinn a' Mhanaich (709 m) is a hill in the southern Grampian Mountains of Scotland. It is located in Argyll and Bute, in the southern Luss Hills north of the town of Helensburgh.

The most westerly of the Luss Hills, its finest feature is its long southern ridge. An army firing range is located on the western side of the hill going down to Loch Long, and one is advised to pay attention to signs while traversing the ridge.

References

Marilyns of Scotland
Grahams
Mountains and hills of Argyll and Bute
Mountains and hills of the Southern Highlands